Anatoly Sanin is a Ukrainian retired footballer.

Career
Anatoly Sanin, started his career with Metalist-2 Kharkiv in 1998 until 2001  and he moved to Metalist Kharkiv and Zirka Kropyvnytskyi. In 2003 he moved to Metalist Kharkiv where he won the Ukrainian First League in the season 2003–04 and promoted to the Ukrainian Premier League. In 2004 he moved to, Desna Chernihiv, the club in the city of Chernihiv where he manage to get second place in Ukrainian Second League in the season 2004–05. In 2004 he moved back to Metalist-2 Kharkiv and in 2005 he played 2 matches with Zorya Luhansk where he contribute to with the Ukrainian First League in the season 2005–06. In 2006 he moved to Finland with YPA where he played only 1 match. In 2007 until 2008 he played 8 match with Sevastopol.

Honours
Zorya Luhansk
 Ukrainian First League: 2005–06

Metalist Kharkiv
 Ukrainian First League: 2003–04

Desna Chernihiv
 Ukrainian Second League: Runner-Up 2004–05

References

External links 
 Anatoly Sanin footballfacts.ru
 Anatoly Sanin allplayers.in.ua

1990 births
Living people
FC Desna Chernihiv players
Ukrainian footballers
Ukrainian Premier League players
Ukrainian First League players
Ukrainian Second League players
Ukrainian expatriate sportspeople in Finland
Expatriate footballers in Finland
Association football defenders